Norman Geoffrey Jukes (14 October 1932 – 12  February 2021) was an English professional footballer who played as a full-back in the Football League for York City, and was on the books of Huddersfield Town without making a league appearance.

References

1932 births
2021 deaths
English footballers
Association football fullbacks
Huddersfield Town A.F.C. players
York City F.C. players
English Football League players
Footballers from Leeds
Place of death missing